Peter Leslie "Dino" Dines (17 December 1944 – 28 January 2004) was a British keyboard player, best known for his work as a member of T-Rex.  Dines was also a member of Apostolic Intervention and the Keef Hartley Band.

Career

Early
Dines was a member of Apostolic Intervention alongside future Humble Pie/Syd Barrett drummer Jerry Shirley. Their song "(Tell Me) Have You Ever Seen Me" was donated by future Humble Pie frontman Steve Marriott.

Later, Dines played in the Keef Hartley Band, fronted by his future T-Rex bandmate Miller Anderson, also contributing keyboards to Anderson's first solo album, "Bright City".  During Dines' time in the band, they released the albums Halfbreed and The Battle of North West Six.  Dines later returned for the album Overdog.

T-Rex
Dines joined T-Rex in mid-1974 and remained until the band disbanded in 1977 due to leader Marc Bolan's death in a car accident.  During his time in the band, the group recorded and released the albums Bolan's Zip Gun, Futuristic Dragon and Dandy in the Underworld, as well as the UK Top 30 hit singles "Light Of Love", "New York City" and "I Love To Boogie". Dines performed with the band extensively on the TV show Supersonic as well as Bolan's own show Marc.

Later
Dines spent his later years performing with T.Rex tribute band T.Rextasy, and played on their albums. He died of a heart attack in 2004 aged 59.

References

1944 births
2004 deaths
British rock keyboardists
T. Rex (band) members